Vendry Ronaldo Mofu (born 10 September 1989) is an Indonesian professional footballer who plays as a midfielder for Liga 2 club Semen Padang.

International career 
Vendry Mofu receives and score his first senior international cap against North Korea on 10 September 2012. 
Indonesian's goal tally first.

Honours

Club
Semen Padang
Indonesia Premier League: 2011-12
Indonesian Community Shield: 2013
Dewa United
 Liga 2 third place (play-offs): 2021

References

External links 
 
 Vendry Mofu at Liga Indonesia

1989 births
Living people
Indonesian footballers
People from Wamena
Association football midfielders
Liga 1 (Indonesia) players
Indonesian Premier League players
Persiwa Wamena players
Semen Padang F.C. players
Sriwijaya F.C. players
Dewa United F.C. players